is a village located in Nagano Prefecture, Japan. , the village had an estimated population of 6,117 in 2022 households, and a population density of 92 persons per km².

Geography
Takagi is located in the Ina Valley mountainous southern of Nagano Prefecture, on a river terrace formed by the Tenryū River, which flows through the village.

Surrounding municipalities
Nagano Prefecture
 IIda
 Takamori
 Toyooka

Climate
The town has a climate characterized by hot and humid summers, and cold winters (Köppen climate classification Cfa).  The average annual temperature in Takagi is 11.9 °C. The average annual rainfall is 1717 mm with September as the wettest month. The temperatures are highest on average in August, at around 24.0 °C, and lowest in January, at around -0.0 °C.

Demographics 
Per Japanese census data, the population of Takagi has declined slightly in recent decades.

History
The area of present-day Takagi was part of ancient Shinano Province. The village was established on April 1, 1889 with the establishment of the modern municipalities system.

Economy
The economy of Takagi is primarily agricultural, with strawberries and konjac as notable crops. The village was traditionally known for its production of Japanese umbrellas.

Education
Takagi has two public elementary schools and one public middle school operated by the village government. The village does not have a high school.<ref.Takagi village official home page</ref>

Transportation

Railway
The village does not have any passenger railway service.

Highway
The village is not located on any national highway.

References

External links
 
Official Website 

 
Villages in Nagano Prefecture